Mary Norris (born February 7, 1952) is an American author, writer and copy editor for The New Yorker.

Early life 
Mary Norris was raised in Cleveland, Ohio. She graduated from Rutgers University in 1974 and earned a master's degree in English from the University of Vermont.

Career 

Norris joined the editorial staff at The New Yorker in 1978. She has been a query proofreader at the magazine since 1993. She has also been a contributor to "The Talk of the Town" and The New Yorker website.

Her first book, Between You & Me: Confessions of a Comma Queen, was published by W. W. Norton & Co in 2015. Norris was a finalist in the 2016 Thurber Prize for American Humor for Between You & Me. She gave a TED talk at TED2016 on the same topic. Her second book, Greek to Me – Adventures of a Comma Queen (2019), explores her relation to foreign languages, particularly to classical Greek.

References

External links 

 New Yorker profile

American copy editors
The New Yorker editors
The New Yorker staff writers
21st-century American women writers
Living people
1952 births
Rutgers University alumni
Women magazine editors
American women non-fiction writers
21st-century American non-fiction writers